The Paphos Tigers are an independent rugby union club based in Paphos, Cyprus. They are known as the first independent rugby club in Cyprus. They have been established since July 10, 2003. The Paphos Tigers have a senior rugby team as well as a minis rugby section which is responsible to develop and promote rugby union in the Paphos region. The Tigers compete in various competitions ranging from the 15's, 10's, 7's and beach rugby. The minis enter into tag tournaments that run monthly during the season in the different towns.

History

Having starting playing rugby in Cyprus as a small independent team, organising ad hoc games with various opposition, the Tigers soon joined the JSRFU (Joint Service Rugby Football Union), along with their rivals, the Limassol Crusaders, which administers the services league in Cyprus. The Tigers now play in the league which falls under the CRF Cyprus Rugby Federation

Alongside the league competition there is also a cup competition  between the teams who have entered the league.

The team were predominantly made up of South Africans who learned the game from their home countries, and British resettlers. Cyprus national rugby union team.

Recent record

Teams

International Players

See also
 Cyprus Rugby Federation

References

External links
 Paphos Tigers

Cypriot rugby union teams